Sieb is a surname and given name. Notable people with the name include:

Surname
 Armindo Sieb (born 2003), German professional football player
 John L. Sieb (1864–1941), American politician and barber
 Wally Sieb (1899–1974), American professional football player

Given name
 Sieb Dijkstra (born 1966), Dutch football coach and former professional footballer

See also
 Theodor Siebs (1862–1941), German linguist
 Siebs's law, a Proto-Indo-European (PIE) phonological rule